Calathus subfuscus is a species of ground beetle from the Platyninae subfamily that is endemic to Madeira.

References

subfuscus
Beetles described in 1865
Endemic fauna of Madeira
Beetles of Europe